Nicholas Nickleby is a British television series which first aired on BBC 1 in 1968. It is based on the novel Nicholas Nickleby by Charles Dickens, following a compassionate young man who, after the death of his father, tries to save his friends and family from his wicked uncle, and earn a living strong enough to support them.

Cast
 Martin Jarvis as Nicholas Nickleby (13 episodes)
 Susan Brodrick as Kate Nickleby (12 episodes)
 Hugh Walters as Smike (12 episodes)
 Derek Francis as Ralph Nickleby (11 episodes)
 Gordon Gostelow as Newman Noggs (11 episodes)
 Thea Holme as Mrs. Catherine Nickleby (11 episodes)
 Ronald Radd as Wackford Squeers (7 episodes)
 Maxwell Shaw as Mr. Mantalini (7 episodes)
 Thelma Ruby as Madame Mantalini (6 episodes)
 Terence Alexander as  Sir Mulberry Hawk (5 episodes)
 Raymond Clarke as  Lord Frederick Verisopht (5 episodes)
 Hazel Coppen as Miss La Creevy (5 episodes)
 Sharon Gurney as  Madeline Bray (5 episodes)
 John Bailey as Brooker (4 episodes)
 Geoffrey Bayldon as Arthur Gride (4 episodes)
 Malcolm Epstein as  Wackford Junior (4 episodes)
 John Gill as  Ned Cheeryble (4 episodes)
 Bartlett Mullins as  Tim Linkinwater (4 episodes)
 Paul Shelley as  Frank Cheeryble  (4 episodes)
 Rosalind Knight as Miss Snevellicci (2 episodes)

Archive status
The original 405 line black and white master videotapes for the serial were wiped sometime after broadcast, although all episodes survived as 16mm telerecordings. The full serial is unavailable online and was not included on DVD by Simply Media when the company released other surviving Dickens serials produced by the BBC between 1958 and 1969 (such as versions of Bleak House and Great Expectations).

See also
 Nicholas Nickleby (1957 TV series) – 10-part BBC serial

References

Bibliography
 Michael Pointer. Charles Dickens on the Screen: The Film, Television, and Video Adaptations. Scarecrow Press, 1996.

External links
 

BBC television dramas
1968 British television series debuts
1968 British television series endings
1960s British drama television series
English-language television shows
Television series set in the 19th century
Television shows based on works by Charles Dickens